Cambodian New Year (or Khmer New Year), also known as Choul Chnam Thmey and Moha Sangkranta or just Sangkranta, is the traditional celebration of the solar new year in Cambodia. A three-day public holiday in the country, the observance begins on New Year's Day, which usually falls on 13 April or 14 April, which is the end of the harvesting season, when farmers enjoy the fruits of their labor before the rainy season begins. Khmers living abroad may choose to celebrate during a weekend rather than just specifically 13 April through 16 April. The Khmer New Year coincides with the traditional solar new year in several parts of India, Bangladesh, Nepal, Sri Lanka, Myanmar, Laos  and Thailand.

The three days of the new year

Moha Sangkranta
Moha Sangkranta or Sangkranta, derived from Sanskrit , is the name of the first day of the new year celebration. It is the end of the year and the beginning of a new one. People dress up and light candles and burn incense sticks at shrines, where the members of each family pay homage to offer thanks for the Buddha's teachings by bowing, kneeling and prostrating themselves three times in front of  his image. For good luck people wash their face with holy water in the morning, their chests at noon, and their feet in the evening before they go to bed.

Veareak Vanabat
Veareak Vanabat is the name of the second day of the new year celebration. People contribute charity to the less fortunate by helping the poor, servants, homeless, and low-income families. Families attend a dedication ceremony to their ancestors at monasteries.

Veareak Laeung Sak
Veareak Laeung Sak in Khmer is the name of the third day of the new year celebration. Buddhists wash the Buddha statues and their elders with perfumed water. Bathing the Buddha images is a symbolic practice to wash bad actions away like water clean dirt from household items. It is also thought to be a kind deed that will bring longevity, good luck, happiness and prosperity in life. By washing their grandparents and parents, the children can obtain from them best wishes and good pieces of advice to live the life for the rest of the year.

New Year's customs 

In temples, people erect a sand hillock on temple grounds. They mound up a big pointed hill of sand or dome in the center which represents Valuka Chaitya, the stupa at Tavatimsa where the Buddha's hair and diadem are buried. The big stupa is surrounded by four small ones, which represent the stupas of the Buddha's favorite disciples: Sariputta, Moggallana, Ananda, and Maha Kassapa. There is another tradition called  : pouring water or liquid plaster (a mixture of water with some chalk powder) on elder relative, or people (mostly the younger generation is responsible for pouring the water).

The Khmer New Year is also a time to prepare special dishes. One of these is a "kralan": a cake made from steamed rice mixed with beans or peas, grated coconut and coconut milk. The mixture is stuffed inside a bamboo stick and slowly roasted.

Traditional games  

Cambodia is home to a variety of traditional games played to transform the dull days into memorable occasions. These games are similar to those played in Manipur, a north-eastern state in India. Throughout the Khmer New Year, street corners often are crowded with friends and families enjoying a break from routine, filling their free time with dancing and games. Typically, Khmer games help maintain one's mental and physical dexterity.

() is a game played especially on the first nightfall of the Khmer New Year by two groups of boys and girls. Ten or 20 people comprise each group, standing in two rows opposite each other. When it is caught, it will be rapidly thrown back to the first group.

() is a game played by imitating a hen as she protects her chicks from a crow. Adults typically play this game on the night of the first New Year's Day. Participants usually appoint a strong player to play the hen who protects "her" chicks, while another person is picked to be the "crow". While both sides sing a song of bargaining, the crow tries to catch as many chicks as possible as they hide behind the hen.

() is the simple style consists of just throwing the Angkunhs to hit the target Angkunhs. The extended style adds five more stages in addition to the throwing stage. Both styles end with a penalty called Jours-activity that the winning team members get to perform on the losing team members. The Jours-activity is performed by using the Angkunghs the hit the knees of the losing team.

⁣
⁣ is a game played by a group of children sitting in a circle. Someone holding a "kanseng" (Cambodian towel) that is twisted into a round shape walks around the circle while singing a song. The person walking secretly tries to place the "kanseng" behind one of the children. If that chosen child realizes what is happening, he or she must pick up the "kanseng" and beat the person sitting next to him or her.

() is a game played by two children in rural or urban areas during their leisure time. Ten holes are dug in the shape of an oval into a board in the ground. The game is played with 42 small beads, stones or fruit seeds. Before starting the game, five beads are put into each of the two holes located at the tip of the board. Four beads are placed in each of the remaining eight holes. The first player takes all the beads from any hole and drops them one by one in the other holes. He or she must repeat this process until they have dropped the last bead into a hole that lies besides any empty one. Then they must take all the beads in the hole that follows the empty one. At this point, the second player may have his turn. The game ends when all the holes are empty. The player with the greatest number of beads wins the game. It is possibly similar to congkak.

Angkor Sangkran 

 is a Khmer New Year event organized by the Union of Youth Federations of Cambodia (UYFC) in Siem Reap from 14–16 April. The cultural event is an opportunity for all Cambodians to unite, and for foreign friends to receive unforgettable and exquisite experiences during Khmer New Year in Cambodia.

Dates in Khmer calendar

See also 
Water Festival
Chinese zodiac
South and Southeast Asian New Year

References 

New Year celebrations
Buddhist holidays
Observances on non-Gregorian calendars
Public holidays in Cambodia